Zubair Malik (born 20 February 1998) is a Pakistani cricketer. He made his first-class debut for Lahore Blues in the 2018–19 Quaid-e-Azam Trophy on 25 September 2018.

References

External links
 

1998 births
Living people
Pakistani cricketers
Lahore Blues cricketers
Place of birth missing (living people)